The 2018 Thurrock Council elections took place on 3 May 2018 to elect members of Thurrock Council in England. Councillors in 16 out of the 20 electoral wards were to be up for election. The council remained under no overall control, with a minority Conservative administration running the council.

On 26 January 2018, all sitting UKIP councillors resigned from the party and formed a new opposition group called Thurrock Independents.

On 13 March 2018, Basildon UKIP announced that they had taken over responsibility for the 6 East Thurrock wards and are now called UKIP Basildon and Thurrock Branch.

Before the elections, there was a by-election held in Ockendon which resulted in a Conservative gain after a tie and drawing of lots.

Council Composition
Going into the election, the composition of the council was:

After the election, the composition of the council was:

Election Results
Comparisons for the purpose of determining a gain, hold or loss of a seat, and for all percentage changes, is to the last time these specific seats were up for election in 2014.

Ward Candidates

All percentage changes are versus 2014, the last time the comparable set of wards were fought.
Holds / Gains are given against control of ward going in to the 2018 elections.

Aveley & Uplands

† Percentage change calculated from the 2014 Aveley & Uplands by-election at which Aker was elected (as a UKIP candidate). He subsequently defected from the UKIP group on Thurrock council and formed Thurrock Independents, although he still sits as a UKIP MEP.

Belhus

 

No UKIP candidate as previously (-49.6%).

† change calculated from the 2014 election when Baker was originally elected (as a UKIP candidate).

Chadwell St Mary

 

Note no UKIP as previously (-39%), no Lib Dem as previously (-2%)

Grays Riverside

 

Note no UKIP candidate as previously (-34%)

Grays Thurrock

 

Note no UKIP candidate as previously (-36%)

Little Thurrock Blackshots

 

Note no UKIP candidate as previously (-39%)

Little Thurrock Rectory

 

Note no UKIP candidate as previously (-32%)

Ockendon

 

Note no UKIP as previously (-46%)

Orsett

South Chafford

 

Note no UKIP as previously (-26%)

Stanford East & Corringham Town

Stifford Clays

The Homesteads

Tilbury Riverside & Thurrock Park

 

Note no UKIP candidate as previously (-36%)

Tilbury St Chads

 

Note no UKIP candidate as previously (-42%)

West Thurrock & South Stifford

 

Note no UKIP candidate as previously (-34%)

References

2018 English local elections
2018